"Ride the Wind" is a song by American glam metal band Poison. It was the third single from the group's 1990 studio album Flesh & Blood, released on Capitol.

Background
The track is one of several that reflects ensemble's maturing songwriting of the time. It has been described as one of Poison's best songs. The lyrics are similar to those found in Western music.

"Ride the Wind" reached number 25 on the mainstream rock charts and the 38 position on the Billboard Hot 100.

Music video
The music video for the song consists of footage from the Poison's Flesh & Blood tour. It features sequences of the band performing onstage, as well as backstage scenes and shots of the audiences (especially of female fans).

Albums
"Ride the Wind" appears on the following albums:

 Flesh & Blood
 Swallow This Live (live version)
 Seven Days Live (live version)
 Poison's Greatest Hits: 1986-1996
 The Best of Poison: 20 Years of Rock
 Flesh & Blood - 20th Anniversary Edition
 Live, Raw & Uncut CD
 Poison – Box Set (Collector's Edition)
 Double Dose: Ultimate Hits

Charts

References

1990 songs
1991 singles
Poison (American band) songs
Song recordings produced by Bruce Fairbairn
Capitol Records singles
Songs written by Bret Michaels
Songs written by Rikki Rockett
Songs written by Bobby Dall
Songs written by C.C. DeVille